A filling station attendant or gas station attendant (also known as a gas jockey in the US and Canada) is a worker at a full-service filling station who performs services other than accepting payment. Tasks usually include pumping fuel, cleaning windshields, and checking vehicle oil levels. Prior to the introduction of self-starting vehicle engines, attendants would also start vehicle engines by manually turning the crankshaft with a hand crank.

In the United States, gas jockeys were often tipped for their services, but this is now rare as full-service stations are uncommon except in the states New Jersey and Oregon (counties with more than 40,000 residents), the town of Weymouth, Massachusetts, and the town of Huntington, New York, where retail customers are prohibited by law from pumping their own gasoline.

Filling station attendants are still employed at gas stations in many countries. In Finland, for example, filling station attendants are currently only used at Shell's service stations. South African, North Korean and Chinese stations generally offer only full-service. Stations in Indonesia often employ women as filling station attendants, many of whom wear uniforms designed to include the traditional hijab. In Egypt, attendants are employed at every station and tipping them is customary. Cleaning windshields and checking tire pressure are their main tasks besides filling up.

History

Early filling stations were usually located at general stores, where gasoline would be put in buckets and funneled into vehicles. Most early stations were little more than a manually powered roadside pump operated by an attendant.

Decline
In the 1970s, two periods of gasoline shortages (1973 and 1979) caused higher fuel prices which in turn resulted in permanent closure of many full-service gas stations as consumers looked for pricing relief.

Russia 
Self-service fuel filling was banned in the Soviet Union because it went against the communist ideology. Soviet stations only offered full service, as full service neatly aligned Soviet ideology. However, self-service fuel filling became legalised in 1991 in connection with the termination of the USSR's existence, mainly in modern-day Russia.

Current status
In most western countries today, full-service stations and their attendants are not common and are usually considered somewhat nostalgic.

United States

In New Jersey self-service fuel filling is illegal. It was banned in 1949 after lobbying by service station owners. Service stations only offer full service and "mini service". Proponents of the ban cite safety and jobs as reasons to keep the ban.

The State of Oregon banned self-service in 1951, but legalised it from 2018 in counties with 40,000 residents or fewer. In 2020, as a response to the COVID-19 pandemic Oregon temporarily allowed self-service statewide.

In the town of Huntington, New York self-service gas stations are illegal, with all gas stations being full-service.

Brazil

In Brazil, self-service fuel filling is illegal, due to a federal law enacted in 2000. The bill was proposed by Federal Deputy Aldo Rebelo, who claims it saved 300,000 fuel attendant jobs across the country.

China 
As China is hostile to private property (China is a communist country), self-service fuel filling is illegal. However, this does not apply to Hong Kong nor in Macau despite these two being part of China.

North Korea 
North Korea is a socialist country, thus, public transport is the norm, and private transport is illegal, as do self-service fuel filling.

South Africa

In South Africa, self-service fuel filling is illegal. Concerns include job losses and the danger of drivers leaving their car.

See also
Fuel dispenser

References

Filling stations
Industrial occupations